The 2019 UCI Para-cycling Track World Championships were the World Championships for track cycling with athletes with a physical disability. The Championships took place in Apeldoorn, Netherlands from 14 to 17 March 2019.

The championships

Apeldoorn in the Netherlands hosted the UCI Para-Cycling Track World Championships for the second time.

Track events

Events were held in five discipline; match sprint, team sprint, time trial, individual pursuit and scratch race, and across 6 disability classifications.
Test events were held for: 1 km Tandem Mixed Team Sprint and Omnium (C1, C2, C3, C4 and C5 for Men and Women). Tests events do not count for the UCI Ranking and are not awarded a World Champion's title.

Medals table

References

External links
Official book of results

UCI Para-cycling Track World Championships
Para-cycling
UCI Para-cycling
UCI Para-cycling
UCI
Cycling in Apeldoorn